The Syro-Malabar Catholic Eparchy of Ujjain (Ujjain of the Syro-Malabars) is a Syro-Malabar eparchy (Eastern Catholic) in India, part of the rite-specific the Syro-Malabar Catholic Church (Syro-Oriental Rite).

It thus depends on the Roman Congregation for the Oriental Churches, but is simultaneously a suffragan see in the ecclesiastical province of the Latin Metropolitan Archdiocese of Bhopal.
 
Its cathedral episcopal see is St. Mary's Cathedral, in Ujjain, Madhya Pradesh state in central India.

Statistics 
As per 2014, it pastorally served 4,602 Eastern Catholics (0.1% of 6,253,649 total) on 18,441 km² in 41 parishes and a mission with 93 priests (41 diocesan, 52 religious), 433 lay religious (120 brothers, 313 sisters) and 9 seminarians.

History 
 It was created on 29 July 1968 as Apostolic Exarchate of Ujjain, on territory split off from the (Latin) Diocese of Indore. 
 On 26 February 1977 the Apostolic Exarchate was elevated to Diocese of Ujjain.

Ordinaries 
(all Syro-Malabar Rite)

Apostolic Exarch of Ujjain 
 Father John Perumattam, Missionary Society of St Thomas (M.S.T.) (29 July 1968 – 26 February 1977 see below)

Suffragan Eparchs (Bishops) of Ujjain 
 John Perumattam, M.S.T. (see above'' 26 February 1977 – retired 4 April 1998), died 2011
 Sebastian Vadakel, M.S.T. (4 April 1998 – ... ), no previous prelature

See also 
 List of Catholic dioceses in India

Sources and external links 
 GCatholic, with Google satellite photo - data for all sections
 Syro-Malabar Catholic Diocese of Ujjain on Catholic-Hierarchy

Eastern Catholic dioceses in India
Syro-Malabar Catholic dioceses
Religious organizations established in 1977
Roman Catholic dioceses and prelatures established in the 20th century
Christianity in Madhya Pradesh
1977 establishments in India
Ujjain
History of Ujjain